Baptists in Canada have a rich heritage and background. United Empire Loyalists and more recent arrivals from England and the U.S. formed the core and foundation of the Baptist denomination in Canada.

Statistics and changes
According to the Canada 2011 Census, the number of people in Canada who identify themselves as Baptist is 635,840, about 1.9% of the population, an decrease of about 12.8% in the 10 years since the 2001 census (see Religion in Canada).

A growing practice of existing and new churches in Canada and the United States is the dropping of the term "Baptist" from their church's name.  Often, this practice is due to concern over what is perceived within the church to be a negative stereotype by the general population toward the label "Baptist", but not toward the church or Baptist beliefs in general. This negative stereotype has often been perceived legalism, associated with the word "baptist".  Churches who make this change are interested in attracting people who are unchurched, and who may have barriers with becoming affiliated with a denomination, or specifically becoming a "baptist".  Keeping the distinct name and simply adding Community Church to the end is a common change.

A name such as "Grace Community Church" is felt by these churches to be less likely to cause unnecessary negative stereotypes or offence, to signal and inspire a change in the mindset and vision of the church, and to fit in with the surrounding community better.

In some congregations, this change has been a source of controversy, and has not been easily accepted by some, especially older members.  The most common arguments with this type of "rebranding" are 1) it is deceptive to the public, 2) it is an abandoning of Baptist history, 3) it might lead a church to eventually compromise and abandon their Baptist beliefs in order to be more inclusive, and 4) it may make it more difficult to determine the number of "Baptist" churches and those believing in the "Baptist distinctives".

History
Baptist missionary work began on the Atlantic coast in the 1760s but took around 100 years to reach the west coast.  The first official record of a Baptist church in Canada was that of the Horton Baptist Church (now Wolfville) in Wolfville, Nova Scotia on October 29, 1778.  The church was established with the assistance of the New Light evangelist Henry Alline. Many of Alline's followers, after his death, would convert and strengthen the Baptist presence in the Atlantic region.  Two major groups of Baptists formed the basis of the churches in the maritimes. These were referred to as Regular Baptist (Calvinistic in their doctrine) and Free Will Baptists. The first Black Baptist churches in Nova Scotia were established by Richard Preston. Preston established the New Horizons Baptist Church (formerly known as Cornwallis Street Baptist Church, African Chapel and the African Baptist Church) in 1832. Preston assisted in founding several other Baptist churches across the province and played a major major role in founding the African United Baptist Association in 1854.  

The first congregations organized in Central Canada were at Beamsville, Ontario as early as 1776 and in 1794 at Caldwell's Manor (now Clarenceville, Quebec).  Shortly thereafter churches were organized at Hallowell, Ontario (1795) and Haldimand Township (see Alnwick/Haldimand).  These were Regular Baptist congregations.  Churches which were in agreement began to group together into associations in order to work together for achieving common goals.  A variety of associations and affiliations have occurred since then. Eventually these associations joined together to form a convention. The First Baptist Church in Toronto was founded in 1826 and has the distinction of being both the very first Baptist church and the oldest Black institution in the city of Toronto.   Black refugees fleeing slavery in the United States also founded several other Baptist churches in Ontario including the Sandwich First Baptist Church in 1840 and Amherstburg First Baptist Church in 1848, both of which are National Historic Sites.  The Baptist influence and mission work in Canada began to be firmly established in Toronto with the founding of the Bond Street Baptist Church in 1848.  Many of the original churches were established by specific missionary groups from the United States of America and by various ethnic or language groups, such as the Swedish Baptist Churches (Baptist General Conference of Canada), North American Baptist Conference (German background), and the Ukrainian Evangelical Baptist Convention of Canada.

Three significant shifts in associations have occurred, between 1905 and 1906, in 1927, and in 1953. From 1905 to 1906, the United Baptist Convention of the Maritime Provinces formed from the union of the Maritime Convention of Maritime Baptists, the Free Baptists of New Brunswick, and the Free Baptists of Nova Scotia.   The Union of Regular Baptist Churches was formed in 1927 in Hamilton, Ontario by 77 churches who had withdrawn from the Baptist Convention of Ontario and Quebec (BCOQ). This withdrawal was due to the Fundamentalist–Modernist Controversy, centred on a professor at the Convention's official seminary at McMaster University, who held a liberal/modernist position of theology.

In 1944, the BCOQ joined with the United Baptist Convention of the Maritimes and the Baptist Union of Western Canada to form the first national Canadian Baptist association, the Canadian Baptist Federation. In 1995, they merged with the Canadian Baptist International Ministries to form Canadian Baptist Ministries. The four conventions still exist within the association and counted over 1100 member churches in 1995.

By 1953 some churches had dropped out of the Union of Regular Baptist Churches, but the remainder joined with the Fellowship of Independent Baptist Churches (founded 1933) and formed the Fellowship of Evangelical Baptist Churches in Canada (FEBC). The Regular Baptist Missionary Fellowship of Alberta joined in 1963 and the Convention of Regular Baptist Churches of British Columbia (founded 1927) also joined in 1965.  Known as "The Fellowship", it claims to be the largest evangelical group in Canada, with at least 500 member churches in Canada from coast to coast.

A Regular Baptist church in British Columbia joined a Southern Baptist Convention affiliate in 1953. The first SBC association was formed in 1955 and there are now 233 churches, in most provinces and territories, with the largest concentration in western Canada.

Associations of Baptists in Canada
The following are the major groupings of Baptists in Canada, listed alphabetically:
African United Baptist Association of Nova Scotia 
Association of Reformed Baptist Churches of America
Association of Regular Baptist Churches
Baptist General Conference of Canada
Canadian Baptist Ministries, to which the following four Baptist denominations are affiliated:
Canadian Baptists of Ontario and Quebec
Canadian Baptists of Western Canada
Canadian Baptists of Atlantic Canada
Union d'Églises baptistes francophones du Canada – known in English as the Union of French Baptist Churches of Canada
Canadian National Baptist Convention
Fellowship of Evangelical Baptist Churches in Canada – sometimes known in English simply as The Fellowship
L'Association des Églises Missionnaire Baptiste Landmark du Québec – known in English as the Landmark Missionary Baptist Association of Quebec
L'Association des Églises Réformées Baptistes du Québec
North American Baptist Conference
Sovereign Grace Fellowship of Canada
Independent Baptist churches also exist, not aligned with any of the groupings listed above.

Colleges/Universities/Seminaries/Lay Training Institutes (current or closed)

Baptists in Canada have had a long tradition and desire to educate their members. To this end they have built and operated a number of schools of higher education in Canada.

Acadia Divinity College Begun in 1838 as Acadia College (Wolfville, Nova Scotia)
Baptist Bible College Canada and Theological Seminary (Simcoe, Ontario)
Brandon College 1889–1938 at which time it became non-denominational and later (in 1967) renamed Brandon University
Canadian Baptist Bible College  (Winkler, Manitoba)
Canada Baptist College (1836–1849) (Montréal, Québec)
Canadian Baptist Seminary (Langley, British Columbia)
Canadian Literary Institute (became Woodstock College in 1883 and was later folded into McMaster University) (1860–1887) (Woodstock, Ontario)
Canadian Southern Baptist Seminary/Canadian Baptist College (Cochrane, Alberta)
Carey Theological College (Vancouver, British Columbia)
Crandall University (Moncton, New Brunswick)
Faculté de théologie évangélique (Montréal, Québec) (Affiliated with Acadia Divinity College)
FaithWay Baptist College of Canada (Ajax, Ontario)
Heritage Baptist College and Heritage Theological Seminary (Cambridge, Ontario)
Historic Baptist Bible Institute and Seminary (Toronto, Ontario)
Moulton College (originally the ladies department of Woodstock College) – transferred to Toronto as a preparatory school for women (closed in 1954).
McMaster Divinity College Begun in 1881 as Toronto Baptist College (Hamilton, Ontario)
Northwest Baptist Seminary (Langley, British Columbia)
Prairie College, an accredited evangelical college is partnered with the Alberta Baptist Association. Carey Theological College, the seminary of Canadian Baptists of Western Canada is also partnered with Prairie College (Three Hills, Alberta)
Séminaire Baptiste Évangélique Du Québec (Montréal, Québec)
The Pastor's College (Toronto, Ontario)
Toronto Baptist Seminary and Bible College (Toronto, Ontario)
Western Baptist Bible College (Calgary, Alberta) see Northwest Baptist Seminary
Baptist Leadership Training School(1949–?) (Calgary, Alberta) (Closed)
Baptist Training Institute (1957–?) (Brantford, Ontario) (Closed)
Baptist Leadership Education Centre (1985–2002) (Whitby, Ontario) (Closed)

References

Further reading
 Coops, Lorraine "'Shelter from the Storm': The Enduring Evangelical Impulse of Baptists in Canada, 1880s to 1890s, in G. A. Rawlyk, ed., Aspects of the Canadian Evangelical Experience (McGill-Queens Press, 1997), pp. 208-223.
 Fitch, E. R., ed. . The Baptists of Canada (Toronto, 1911)
 Heath, Gordon L., and Paul R. Wilson, eds. Baptists and Public Life in Canada (Wipf and Stock Publishers, 2012)
 McLeod, Tommy. "'To Bestir Themselves:' Canadian Baptists and the Origins of Brandon College," Manitoba History (2007), Issue 56, pp 22-31. online
  Rawlyk, George, ed. Canadian Baptist and Canadian Higher Education(McGill-Queen's University Press, 1988).
 Wilson, Robert S. "Patterns of Canadian Baptist Life in the Twentieth Century," Baptist History & Heritage'' (2001) 36# 1/2, pp 27–60. Covers the educational, social, political, missionary, and theological trends; notes that the years 1953-2000 were marked by the union of different Baptist groups.

External links
 Baptist General Conference of Canada - official Web Site
 Fellowship of Evangelical Baptist Churches in Canada - official Web Site
 Canadian National Baptist Convention - official Web Site
 Canadian Baptist Ministries - official Web site

Baptist Christianity in Canada
Canadian Baptists